Cornelis Felix van Maanen (September 9, 1769 – February 14, 1849) was a Dutch minister and jurist.

Van Maanen was born in The Hague. He studied law in Leiden, and entered legal practice in The Hague, where he later became general prosecutor. He rose to prominence under the French-dominated Kingdom of Holland, being appointed Minister of Justice in 1806 by Louis Bonaparte, and to the Council of State and as head of the Court of Appeals in The Hague in 1810 by Napoleon. He adapted to the changing political circumstances well, however, and was again appointed Minister of Justice in 1815 by King William of the new United Kingdom of the Netherlands. Along with de Nagell, he was a signatory of the Treaty of The Hague (1818), by which the British and Dutch established the Anglo-Dutch Mixed Commission Courts. He was active in promoting the Dutch language in Belgium and advising the King against giving concessions in the turmoil that led to the Belgian Revolution. He left office in 1842, following the abdication of King William.

References

 

1769 births
1849 deaths
Ministers of Justice of the Netherlands
Politicians from The Hague
Lawyers from The Hague
Leiden University alumni
People of the Belgian Revolution
People of the Kingdom of Holland